Westward Bound may refer to:

 Westward Bound (1930 film), American western film
 Westward Bound (1944 film), American western film